Emmalocera apotomella is a species of snout moth in the genus Emmalocera. It was described by Edward Meyrick in 1879. It is found in Australia (Queensland), India, Sri Lanka, the Philippines, Sulawesi and Timor.

References

Moths described in 1879
Emmalocera